During rolling stock operation in the USSR and Russia some local trains (elektrichkas) were given their own official names.

References

External links 
 

Named passenger trains of Russia